Dendropsophus sarayacuensis (common name: Shreve's Sarayacu treefrog or Clown tree frog) is a species of frog in the family Hylidae.

It is found in the Amazon Basin in Bolivia, Brazil, Ecuador, Peru, Venezuela, and—presumably—Colombia.

Dendropsophus sarayacuensis is a common in parts of its range (Peru and Ecuador). It is nocturnal, arboreal frog inhabiting understorey vegetation in primary and secondary tropical rainforest and forest edges. Eggs are laid out of water whereas the tadpole develop in water, in temporary and permanent pools.

As a pet
They are a very popular exotic pet.

References

sarayacuensis
Amphibians of Bolivia
Amphibians of Brazil
Amphibians of Ecuador
Amphibians of Peru
Amphibians of Venezuela
Amphibians described in 1935
Taxonomy articles created by Polbot
Taxa named by Benjamin Shreve